The Port Huron Pirates were a professional indoor football team based in Port Huron, Michigan. The team was a charter member of the Great Lakes Indoor Football League (GLIFL) joining the league in 2006 as an expansion team. The Pirates were the first professional indoor football team to be based in Port Huron. They played their home games at McMorran Arena in Port Huron, Michigan.

The Pirates are the only team to never lose a regular season game in the history of the Continental Indoor Football League, going 22–0 for the only two years that the team existed.

Franchise history

2006
In their inaugural season, Pirates owner hired Brian Hug to be the head coach. the Pirates went undefeated (10–0), defeated the Battle Creek Crunch in the semifinals, and won the inaugural Great Lakes Bowl I 40–34 over the Rochester Raiders, with RB Rayshawn Askew winning the game's MVP title. Over 2,500 fans witnessed the game, marking one of the biggest crowds to watch a sporting event at McMorran Place. Adding some more great news was the fact that QB Shane Franzer was named the inaugural GLIFL MVP of the All-Star game and Rayshawn Askew was named the inaugural GLIFL Running Back of the Year.

Standings

2007
After the season, head coach Brian Hug left the Pirates to become head coach of the Pahrump Valley High School football team. The Pirates went on to promote assistant Karl Featherstone as their new head coach. In March 2007, Hug was hired by the Las Vegas Gladiators as an assistant offensive/defensive line coach. Featherstone got the team off to a fast start as they defeated the Miami Valley Silverbacks, 54–7, en route to another perfect regular season.

Unfortunately, at halftime of the May 26 game against Marion, in front of an announced crowd of 1,216 fans, the team announced this would be their final season in Port Huron, as they could no longer pay the bills with such lackluster attendance. Speculated relocation cities included Binghamton, New York, Flint, Michigan, and one other Michigan city.

Afterwards, the team announced they would be playing their playoff games at the Perani Arena and Event Center in Flint, Michigan. They were using the playoffs as a test of the arena and the city of Flint for potential relocation.  They then renamed themselves The Michigan Pirates for the rest of the season. 

After winning their first 26 games, the team finally met their Waterloo in the 2007 CIFL Indoor Championship Game, losing to long-time rival Rochester Raiders by a score of 37–27 at Rochester's Blue Cross Arena.

After an offseason of uncertainty regarding whether the team would return, the CIFL moved the Port Huron Pirates from the "Active Teams" section of their message board to the "Defunct Teams" section of their message board, indicating the team has left the league. It was later confirmed by league officials that The Pirates were no more, as Peter Norager sold the team to the owner of Perani Arena and the team was renamed the Flint Phantoms.

Schedule

Standings

Logos and uniforms
The logo featured a fierce pirate, symbolic of the surrounding Great Lake Huron. In the background is a depiction of the Fort Gratiot Lighthouse.

Players of note

Roster

Awards and honors
The following is a list of all Port Huron/Michigan Pirates players who won GLIFL/CIFL Awards.

Head coaches

Season-by-season results

References

Former Continental Indoor Football League teams
American football teams in Michigan
Port Huron, Michigan
Sports in Flint, Michigan
American football teams established in 2006
American football teams disestablished in 2007
2006 establishments in Michigan
2007 disestablishments in Michigan